Coming from the Augustinian Mission of Mexico, the Priest Agustin de la Santísima Trinidad came to Peru with 12 Augustinians and created the Province of Peru, dedicated to the Mother of Grace.

In 1889, the Priest Eustasio Esteban came to Peru and refundated the Province, and this past to the Province of Spain. The Priest Ignacio Monasterio was the current Prior, founding the School of Saint Augustin in San Isidro.

In 2005 the Pronvice regained its independence of the Spanish Province of Santisimo Nombre de Jesús de Filipinas, when the Priest Miguel Diez was Prior.

Elected in 2007, the modern day Provincial Prior is Priest Alexander Lam Alania, O.S.A.

The Augustinians have schools and churches in Lima, Pacasmayo and Chiclayo.

References

External links 
 Order of Saint Augustine, Provincia Nuestra Señora de Gracia del Perú
 Church of Our Lady of Grace, Lima
 Saint Augustine School of Lima
 Saint Augustine School of Chiclayo
 Saint Rose School of Chosica
 Church of Saint Toribio of Mogrovejo, Chosica
 Apostolic Vicariate of Augustinian Missionary of the Order of Saint Augustine in Peru
 Young Pastoral JAX
 Augustinian Pastoral COMMUNIO

Order of St. Augustine
Catholic Church in Peru